Chinese-Armenian Friendship School  is a school in Kanaker, Yerevan, Armenia. It serves grades 5 through 12. It is Armenian-medium with Chinese language being a major focus of study.

The school, with a capacity of 405 students, opened on August 22, 2018. Nikol Pashinyan, the Prime Minister of Armenia, and Tian Erlong, the Ambassador of China to Armenia, attended the school's opening. The school building and supplies had a cost of over $12 million, and the funds to do so came from the Chinese government.

See also
 Armenia-China relations

References

External links

 
 
 驻亚美尼亚大使田二龙陪同亚总理出席中亚友谊学校启用仪式 - Embassy of China in Armenia 
 南通三建承建的中国-亚美尼亚友谊学校盛大启用 - Jiangsu Chamber of Commerce for Import & Export Firms 

Schools in Yerevan
Secondary schools in Armenia
Armenia–China relations
Boarding schools in Armenia
Educational institutions established in 2018
2018 establishments in Armenia